"Irrallaan" is a song by Finnish singer and songwriter Olavi Uusivirta. Released as the first single from his second studio album Me ei kuolla koskaan, the song peaked at number 14 on the Finnish Singles Chart.

Charts

References

2005 singles
Olavi Uusivirta songs
2005 songs